Zain-ul-Hasan (born 30 June 1993) is a Pakistani cricketer. He made his first-class debut for Lahore Blues in the 2016–17 Quaid-e-Azam Trophy on 1 October 2016.

References

External links
 

1993 births
Living people
Pakistani cricketers
Lahore Blues cricketers
Cricketers from Lahore